Meiotic double-stranded break formation protein 1 is a protein that in humans is encoded by the MEI1 gene.

References

Further reading